Cortuluá, officially named Cortuluá Fútbol Club S. A. and previously known as Corporación Club Deportivo Tuluá, is a Colombian football club from the municipality of Tuluá in the Valle del Cauca. It was founded in 1967 and plays in the Categoría Primera B.

In the 2001 Categoría Primera A season the team had its most successful campaign after winning the Apertura tournament, which granted them a spot in the 2002 Copa Libertadores.

History
Cortuluá was founded in 1967 by a group of people headed by Paraguayan former player and coach Hernando Acosta. In 1993, Cortuluá wins its first title in the Categoría Primera B, being promoted to the Primera A for the following year. Its first game in the top flight was on February 26, 1994 at the Estadio Hernando Martinez Azcárate of nearby Buga against Envigado.

In the 2001 Copa Mustang Cortuluá won the Torneo Apertura (which at that time did not yet award a championship) and qualified for the 2002 Copa Libertadores. However, in 2004 the team were relegated to the Categoría Primera B.

In 2006, the United States Treasury identified the football club as one of ten businesses allegedly operating on behalf of one of the most wanted Colombian drug barons, Carlos Alberto Renteria Mantilla. The move by the United States authorities placed a freeze on any assets owned by the club within the United States, and prevented United States residents from having dealings with the club.

After five years in the Categoría Primera B, the club was promoted back to the Categoría Primera A in 2009. Cortuluá qualified for the final of the "Torneo Apertura", surpassing Deportes Palmira, Deportivo Rionegro, and Atlético Bucaramanga in Group A of the semi-finals. In the final instance against Itagüí Ditaires, the first leg ended 3–1 with a win for Cortuluá, but it lost 2–0 in the second leg. In the penalty shootout Cortuluá won 6–5, thus winning the "Torneo Apertura" and qualifying to the Final of the year, where Cortuluá defeated Atlético Bucaramanga and returned to the top tier for the following season.

In the 2010 season, the team were relegated again and returned to the second division, where they played for four seasons until the 2015 season, when they were once again promoted in a special tournament played to increase the size of the Categoría Primera A to 20 teams. They came on top of Group B, ahead of Unión Magdalena, pre-tournament favorites América de Cali, and Deportivo Pereira and thus earned promotion for the 2015 season. In 2016, its reserve team placed third in the U-20 Copa Libertadores. On the final matchday of the first round of the 2017 Torneo Finalización, Cortuluá were once again relegated to the Primera B, after losing 2–1 to Once Caldas in Manizales with a last-minute goal.

After four years in the second tier, Cortuluá were able to return to Primera A at the end of the 2021 season, winning their semi-final group to clinch one of the two promotion spots. However, they were immediately relegated back to Primera B after a poor campaign that saw them end in last place of the relegation table of the 2022 Primera A. Their relegation was confirmed on 16 October 2022, following a 1–0 home defeat to Deportes Tolima.

Stadium

Estadio Doce de Octubre, located in Tuluá and able to seat 16,000 people, was Cortuluá's home stadium until the end of 2022. Starting from 2023, the club moved its home matches to Estadio Municipal Raúl Miranda in Yumbo, which has a capacity of 3,500 people.

Honours

Domestic honours
Categoría Primera B:
Winners (2): 1993, 2009
Runners-up (3): 2020, 2021-I, 2021-II

International honours
U-20 Copa Libertadores:
Third place (1): 2016

Performance in CONMEBOL competitions
Copa Libertadores: 1 appearance
2002: First Round

U-20 Copa Libertadores:  1 appearance
2016: Third place

Players

Current squad

Out on loan

Notable players

 Álvaro Peña
 Jairo Ampudia
 Javier Arizala
 Faustino Asprilla
 Víctor Bonilla
 Miguel Borja
 Mayer Candelo
 Óscar Díaz
 Diego Gómez
 Héctor Hurtado
 Edison Mafla
 Leonardo Mina Polo
 Johnnier Montaño
 Tressor Moreno
 Rubiel Quintana
 Hamilton Ricard
 Carlos Rodas
 Milton Rodríguez
 Jaime Alfonso Ruiz
 Néstor Salazar
 Fernando Uribe
 Gustavo Victoria
 Mario Yepes
 Julio César Maya
 Rolan de la Cruz
 Danny Quendambú
 Román Torres
 Alejandro Vélez
 Rafael Dudamel
 Edgar Pérez Greco

References

External links

 Web oficial del Cortuluá

 
Football clubs in Colombia
Association football clubs established in 1967
1967 establishments in Colombia
Categoría Primera A clubs
Categoría Primera B clubs